"The Same Old Me" is a 1959 single written by Fuzzy Owen and performed by Ray Price.

Chart performance
"The Same Old Me" was Ray Price's fourth #1 on the country chart spending two weeks at the top and a total of thirty weeks on the chart.  The single's B-side, entitled, "Under Your Spell Again" peaked at #5 on the country chart.

Cover versions
Guy Mitchell released a cover of this song in 1960.  It reached #51 on the Billboard Hot 100.

References

1959 singles
1959 songs
Ray Price (musician) songs
Guy Mitchell songs